Dr. Abdirahman Mohamed Abdi Hashi (is a Somali politician, former minister of fisheries and marine resources in the Federal Government of Somalia. Hashi is the son of co-founder and the former president of Puntland Mohamed Abdi Hashi.

Career
Hashi is an economist by profession, and a financial expert with nearly thirty years of experience working in Wall Street and the World Bank. Dr. Abdirahman was a candidate for the president of Somalia in 2012. He has two master's degrees from Johns Hopkins University and attended George Mason University and received his PhD in economics. He authored a book on Islamic finances, tilted Islamic Banking: Steady in Shaky Times?

Personal life
Hashi hails from the Qayaad tribe of Dhulbahante, a sub-clan of the Darod.

References

Living people
Government ministers of Somalia
1955 births